"Dice" is a single released by Finley Quaye. It was written with Beth Orton and recorded by William Orbit.

Composition
The segment of the song sung by Beth Orton is sampled from "Roll The Dice", a song which originally appeared on her 1993 debut album Superpinkymandy. The album was also produced by her then-boyfriend William Orbit.

Single use
The single was used in the American Fox network TV series The OC in episode 14 of season one, entitled "The Countdown". The song was a minor hit, helped in part by its inclusion on OC's the Season 1 sound track called Music from the OC: Mix 1 (track 10). The TV series Chuck used the same song in episode 6 of season one ("Chuck vs. the Sandworm.") as a parallel to The OC episode.
The song was also featured in episode 14 of season 3 ("Since You've Been Gone") in the TV Series "Everwood."
It can also be found on the Ministry of Sound's Chilled 1991 - 2008.

It has also been used by BBC Scotland in their TV trailer for the TV series called 'Hebrides" 2013

Charts

External links
Music from the OC
Finley Quaye on Myspace
Finley Quaye USA

2004 singles
British rock songs
Finley Quaye songs
2004 songs
Songs written by Beth Orton
Songs written by William Orbit